Chambly is a provincial electoral district in the Montérégie region of Quebec, Canada. It includes the city of Chambly and other smaller municipalities.

It was created for the 1867 election (and an electoral district of that name existed earlier in the Legislative Assembly of the Province of Canada and the Legislative Assembly of Lower Canada).

In the change from the 2001 to the 2011 electoral map, it lost Saint-Bruno-de-Montarville to the newly created Montarville electoral district.

Members of the Legislative Assembly / National Assembly

Election results

|}

|}

^ Change is from redistributed results. CAQ change is from ADQ.

 
|Liberal
|Stéphanie Doyon
|align="right"|14,485
|align="right"|36.11

References

External links
Information
 Elections Quebec

Election results
 Election results (National Assembly)

Maps
 2011 map (PDF)
 2001 map (Flash)
2001–2011 changes (Flash)
1992–2001 changes (Flash)
 Electoral map of Montérégie region
 Quebec electoral map, 2011

Chambly, Quebec
Quebec provincial electoral districts